Verrières is a commune in the Orne department in north-western France.

History 

In the 15th century, the parish of Verrières belonged to the barony of Villeray in Condeau. For nearly a century (1850-1950), Verrières was one of the cradles of horse breeding Percheron.

See also
Communes of the Orne department

References

Communes of Orne